Squash at the 2014 Asian Games was held in the Yeorumul Squash Courts, in Incheon, South Korea from September 20 to September 27, 2014.

Competition consists of men's and women's singles and team competitions, Malaysia finished first in medal table.

Schedule

Medalists

Medal table

Participating nations
A total of 69 athletes from 11 nations competed in squash at the 2014 Asian Games:

References

External links
Official website
Squashinfo website
Asian Squash Federation

 
2014 Asian Games events
Asian Games
2014
2014 Asian Games